Pavel Okhremchuk (born 18 June 1993) is a Belarusian professional footballer who plays for Smorgon.

References

External links 
 
 

1993 births
Living people
Belarusian footballers
Association football goalkeepers
Belarus youth international footballers
FC Minsk players
FC Smolevichi players
FC Granit Mikashevichi players
FC Belshina Bobruisk players
FC Smorgon players